The Canyon Village Lodge at Yellowstone National Park is the largest single lodging property in Yellowstone National Park. Its renovation, first envisioned in 1988 as part of the Canyon Redevelopment Plan, is part of a larger undertaking to improve the dining and lodging prospectus park-wide.

Construction
As part of a broader construction project that began in 1956, Canyon Village Lodge functioned as the primary visitor's center for Yellowstone National Park for decades.

The 2016 renovation of the Lodge, in conjunction with the replacement of over four hundred guest rooms, is being executed in coordination with the National Park Service and Xanterra Parks and Resorts.

The renovated Lodge, managed by Xanterra Parks and Resorts, is an extension of the Mission 66 program, which championed a mid-century modern architectural style adapted to the natural surroundings of Yellowstone National Park.

The larger upgrade project will feature new dining halls, bike paths, and sustainability improvements.

References

Buildings and structures in Yellowstone National Park in Wyoming
2015 establishments in Wyoming
Hotels in Wyoming
Hotels established in 2015